Nuoliang Township is a rural township in Cangyuan Va Autonomous County, Yunnan, China.  it had a population of 14,665 and an area of . The township shares a border with Mengjiao Township to the west, Menglai Township to the northwest, Danjia Township to southeast, Mengsheng Town to the northeast, and Mengdong Town to the southwest.

Name
The word Nuoliang is transliteration in Dai language. "Nuo" means pond and "Liang" means sacrifice. Legend has it that there is a Chinese dragon in the pond. People often worship it.

History
In the early history, the township had always been under Tusi jurisdiction. In 1945 it belonged to Leliang Township. After the founding of the Communist State, it was under the jurisdiction of Mengsheng District. In 1968 it was renamed Mengsheng Commune and was renamed Jiuda Commune in the following year. In 1984, Nuoliang District was established. It was upgraded to a township in 1988.

Administrative division
As of 2017, the township is divided into 8 villages: Nuoliang, Heling, Nansa, Paqiu, Wengbulao, Bankao, Papo, and Bawei.

Geography

The Mengdong River and Paqiu River, tributaries of the Lancang River, flow through the township.

Nansa Reservoir is the largest body of water in the township.

Economy
Nuoliang Township's economy is based on nearby mineral resources and agricultural resources. The region abounds with lead, zinc, copper, iron and limestone. Sugarcane, tobacco, walnut and rapeseed are the main cash crops.

Education
The town has 9 public schools: 8 primary schools and 1 middle school.

Transportation
The Provincial Highway S314 passes across the township. 

The Banmeng Expressway is under construction.

The Cangyuan Washan Airport serves the township.

References

Bibliography
 

Divisions of Cangyuan Va Autonomous County